The Battle of Athenry (Athenry, County Galway, Ireland) can refer to:
 First Battle of Athenry, 15 August 1249 
 Second Battle of Athenry, 10 August 1316